Scott Phelan (born 13 March 1988) is an English former professional footballer.

Playing career
Born in Liverpool, Phelan was a trainee at Everton, captaining the under 18 and reserve sides, until he was released in 2007 without making a senior appearance. He was handed a trial at Bradford City, after which he was handed a one-year contract to become the third young midfielder to join League Two side Bradford City from the Toffees in recent years, following Tom Kearney and Steven Schumacher. He made his league debut when he came on as a late substitute in Bradford's 2–1 victory over Wrexham on 25 August 2007. He played 15 games for Bradford, 12 of which have been in the league, but the last came in December 2007, before he was one of 13 players to be released on 29 April 2008. He played one more game in the club's final game of the season, four days later, as City lost 2–1 to Wycombe Wanderers, bringing his total number of appearances for the club to 16.

After four months without a club, Phelan joined Northern Premier League Division One North-side FC Halifax Town in September 2008. Phelan was handed his Halifax debut a day later in a 7–1 victory over Salford City as a second-half substitute, a role he had for the next three games.

In May 2011 he signed for Kidderminster Harriers after the expiry of his contract with Halifax.

He joined Vauxhall Motors on loan in December 2011. He was released by Kidderminster Harriers in February 2012, joining Vauxhall Motors for two weeks, before joining Altrincham. He quit playing in August 2012 to become a full-time coach at Everton.

References

External links

England FA profile

1988 births
Living people
English footballers
Everton F.C. players
Bradford City A.F.C. players
FC Halifax Town players
English Football League players
Footballers from Liverpool
England youth international footballers
Kidderminster Harriers F.C. players
Vauxhall Motors F.C. players
Altrincham F.C. players
Everton F.C. non-playing staff
Association football midfielders